Serge Rodnunsky is a film-maker who has directed almost 50 feature films as part of Rojak Films and now Interlight Entertainment .  He started his career as a dancer and choreographer and worked in American Ballet Theater   He also studied Physics at New York University.

Filmography 

 Fighting to Forgive (completed) 
 2012 War Flowers 
 2010/1 The Portal 
 2007 Chill
 2006 Dead Lenny 
 2005 Blade of the Vampire (video) (as Miles Feldman) 
 2005 Shattered Day 
 2005 Indigo Hearts 
 2004 Black Cat (video) 
 2004 The Dead of Night (video) (as Miles Feldman) 
 2003 Delusional (as Miles Feldman) 
 2001 Altered Species (as Miles Feldman) 
 2000 American Samurai 
 2000 NewsBreak 
 2000 Cypress Edge 
 2000 Fear Runs Silent (video) 
 2000 Tripfall 
 2000 Enticement (as Miles Feldman) 
 2000 Hitmen 
 2000 Split Intent 
 2000 BigBrother.com (as Miles Feldman) 
 1999 Silicon Towers 
 1999 Jack of Hearts
 1997 Cold Night Into Dawn 
 1997 Dead Tides 
 1997 Malibu Nights 
 1997 Tiger 
 1996 Diamonds in the Rough 
 1996 Running Hard 
 1995 Final Equinox 
 1995 Blood Justice 
 1995 Hot Wired 
 1995 Powderburn 
 1995 Red Steel 
 1994 Brush with Death 
 1994 Lovers, Lovers 
 1993 Last Breath 
 1993 Mystic Seven 
 1993 Rage of Vengeance 
 1992 Life After Sex 
 1990 A Play for Saulie 
 1990 Bold Stroke

References 

http://www.imdb.com/name/nm0271084/bio  [IMDb Mini Biography By: Tim Andrews ]

Year of birth missing (living people)
Living people